When Love Forgives is a 1913 American short drama film featuring Harry Carey.

Cast
 Charles West - The Man
 George Beranger - The Bartender
 Charles Gorman - First Criminal
 Harry Carey - Second Criminal
 Charles Hill Mailes - The Employer

See also
 Harry Carey filmography

External links

1913 films
American silent short films
American black-and-white films
1913 drama films
1913 short films
Films directed by Anthony O'Sullivan
Silent American drama films
1910s American films